With Arms Wide Open: A Retrospective is a compilation album by American rock band Creed, which was released on November 20, 2015. It is a three disc set, with disc one devoted to the band's radio hits, disc two for rarities and demos, and disc three for acoustic tracks. It is Creed's first album released since the acquisition of Wind-up Records by Concord Bicycle Music in May 2015.  With Arms Wide Open: A Retrospective is a Walmart exclusive in the United States.

Background
Guitarist and founding member Mark Tremonti first broke the news of a new Creed release in August 2015 whilst promoting his solo album Cauterize. Following Scott Stapp's mental breakdown in November 2014 and his road to recovery in 2015, Tremonti was asked if he saw himself working with Creed again in the future. Despite playing down the option, the guitarist let slip that he and Stapp were speaking again and would likely collaborate on a box set of Creed's music. During an interview about his recent diagnosis of Bipolar disorder in September, Stapp confirmed a "retrospective" of Creed's material to be released in late 2015 that would contain "hits, favorite album picks, acoustic versions of all the hits, live performances, unreleased demos." Tremonti later stated that he would have preferred a 2017 release date for the retrospective, as it would mark the 20th anniversary of the band's debut album My Own Prison.

Track listing

References

2015 compilation albums
Creed (band) albums